Bikash Bista (Nepali: बिकास बिस्ट; born 3 December 1965) is a Nepalese Economist and Statistician, and the former Director General of Central Bureau of Statistics of Nepal.

Biography

Early years

Bista was born in Palung VDC of Makwanpur District in Nepal to father Om Bahadur Bista and mother Durga Devi Bista. Graduating from Chitwan High School, he enrolled in Tribhuvan University to study Bachelor of Arts and later obtained a master's degree in Economics in 1988. After working in the Central of Bureau of Statistics for nearly 18 years, he became the Deputy Director General (DDG) of the bureau in 2007. He was appointed the Director General of the bureau in 2012.

Career

Bista started his early career as an officer of statistics for Central Bureau of Statistics. Later, he was involved in Social Statistics Division of the CBS as a Deputy Director General. The National Population and Housing Census 2011 was successfully conducted under his supervision as the bureau deputy. The census included major improvements compared to the previous censuses, introducing the geographical GPS Mapping of settlements for data collection that helped to reinforce the authenticity of the new census. In the past, CBS used to rely on political divisions for population census.
This census also became the first census in Nepal to recognize the country's third gender population.
In addition, he has worked on the socio-economic surveys' design and implementation and system of price statistics studies, conducting several surveys in the field, like the Nepal Living Standards Survey- 2010/11.

Personal life
Bista is married to Beenu Bista, who is a professor at Tribhuvan University. The couple has a son, Bivash, who is an Aerospace engineer working for a Lockheed Martin company.

References

1965 births
Living people
Tribhuvan University alumni
People from Makwanpur District
Nepalese economists